Bromsgrove and Redditch was a parliamentary constituency centred on the towns of Bromsgrove and Redditch in Worcestershire.  It returned one Member of Parliament (MP)  to the House of Commons of the Parliament of the United Kingdom.

The constituency was created for the February 1974 general election, and abolished for the 1983 general election.

Boundaries 
The Urban Districts of Bromsgrove and Redditch, and the Rural District of Bromsgrove.

Members of Parliament

Election results

References 

Parliamentary constituencies in Worcestershire (historic)
Constituencies of the Parliament of the United Kingdom established in 1974
Constituencies of the Parliament of the United Kingdom disestablished in 1983
Bromsgrove
Redditch